Pye Corner railway station is a station serving a residential area in the west of Newport, Wales, between the suburbs of Bassaleg and High Cross. It opened on 14 December 2014.

History

Proposal
It was forecast that 135,000 journeys would be made to and from Pye Corner which had a catchment population of 19,040 within  and 4,312 within . Provision of the station was set as a priority in Sewta's Regional Transport Plan published in 2008 and the aspiration was reflected in Network Rail's Wales Route Utilisation Strategy published in November 2008. Land for the station was safeguarded in Newport City Council's Unitary Development Plan.

In March 2012, proposals for a single-platform station, situated to the east of the line and accessed from a new road junction on Western Valley Road opposite High Cross Lane, were put out to consultation. The plans included provision for a second platform to be provided at a later date. The grant of £2.5m was confirmed in May 2013, to which the Welsh Government would add a further £1m.

The station's location is close to the former Bassaleg Junction station.

Construction
In February 2014, a planning application for the station was passed by Newport City Council, with planners recommending the construction of a screen or fence to protect the privacy of properties adjacent to the station which back on to the line. The first train to arrive at the station on the opening day of 14 December 2014 was the 09:15 from Ebbw Vale.

Services
On Sundays, the hourly Cardiff to Ebbw Vale service runs via Newport.

See also
 Railway stations in Newport

References

Notes

Sources

External links

Archive of Ebbw Valley Railway Scheme website (Blaenau Gwent council, 2008)

Railway stations in Newport, Wales
Railway stations in Great Britain opened in 2014
Railway stations opened by Network Rail
2014 establishments in Wales
Railway stations served by Transport for Wales Rail